Asymphorodes acerba is a moth of the family Agonoxenidae. It was described by Edward Meyrick in 1929. It is found in French Polynesia.

References

Agonoxeninae
Moths described in 1929
Moths of Oceania
Endemic fauna of French Polynesia